Copelatus galapagoensis is a species of diving beetle. It is part of the genus Copelatus in the subfamily Copelatinae of the family Dytiscidae. It was described by G. R. Waterhouse in 1845.

References

galapagoensis
Beetles described in 1845